Live at the Roxy Theatre is a live album released by Brian Wilson in 2000.  After a successful period of touring following the release of Imagination, Wilson decided to record his first-ever live solo album.  Accompanied by his supporting band, Wilson recorded the album during a pair of shows at the Roxy Theatre in West Hollywood.

While the album includes performances of several of Wilson's old Beach Boys favorites, there are a few surprises amid the well-known classics.  Wilson takes the opportunity to introduce two songs: "The First Time" and "This Isn't Love" (itself a collaboration with Pet Sounds lyricist Tony Asher).  In addition, in a moment of humor, the flesh and blood Wilson sings a portion of Barenaked Ladies' song "Brian Wilson".  Because of Wilson's continuing ease in front of audiences, and the confident performances throughout, Live at the Roxy Theatre received positive reviews upon release.

Live at the Roxy Theatre was initially and exclusively distributed through Wilson's freshly inaugurated website in June 2000 on his own Brimel Records label for one year.  An independent label, Oglio Records, subsequently redistributed Live at the Roxy Theatre to stores with the addition of three bonus tracks. There was also an additional Japanese release with six bonus tracks, all on disc 2 of the set.

Track listing
All songs by Brian Wilson and Mike Love, except where noted.

Disc one
"Little Girl Intro" – 0:59
 Uses excerpts from "The Little Girl I Once Knew"'s 13 October 1965 tracking date
"The Little Girl I Once Knew" (Brian Wilson) – 3:25
"This Whole World" (Brian Wilson) – 1:51
"Don't Worry Baby" (Brian Wilson, Roger Christian) – 3:27
"Kiss Me Baby" – 3:12
"Do It Again" – 3:25
"California Girls" – 4:07
"I Get Around" – 2:35
"Back Home" (Brian Wilson) – 4:34
"In My Room" (Brian Wilson, Gary Usher) – 2:48
"Surfer Girl" (Brian Wilson) – 3:03
"The First Time" (Brian Wilson) – 3:56
"This Isn't Love" (Brian Wilson, Tony Asher) – 3:55
"Add Some Music to Your Day" (Brian Wilson, Mike Love, Joe Knott) – 4:11
"Please Let Me Wonder" – 3:29

Disc two
"Band Intro" – 1:30
"Brian Wilson" (Steven Page) – 0:55
"Til I Die" (Brian Wilson) – 3:57
"Darlin' " – 2:51
"Let's Go Away for Awhile" (Brian Wilson) – 2:54
"Pet Sounds" (Brian Wilson) – 4:27
"God Only Knows" (Brian Wilson, Tony Asher) – 3:26
"Lay Down Burden" (Brian Wilson, Joe Thomas) – 3:29
"Be My Baby" (Ellie Greenwich, Phil Spector, Jeff Barry) – 4:11
 A song popularized by The Ronettes in 1963 with which Wilson was obsessed
"Good Vibrations" – 6:02
"Caroline, No" (Brian Wilson, Tony Asher) – 5:00
"All Summer Long" – 3:12
"Love and Mercy" (Brian Wilson) – 3:52
"Sloop John B" (Traditional; arranged by Brian Wilson) – 3:34
"Barbara Ann" (Fred Fassert) – 2:44
"Interview With Brian" – 4:21

 Tracks 14-16 of Disc 2 are bonus tracks on the Oglio Records re-release in 2001

UK version
The second disc of the UK release features several bonus tracks:

Live at the Roxy Theatre (Brimel 1001/Oglio OGL 82012) never charted in the U.S. or the UK.  It was also an exclusive internet release for 1 year on Brian Wilson's website, before being reissued in stores with exclusive bonus tracks.

Personnel
Brian Wilson - vocals, keyboards, arrangements
Nick Walusko - guitar, vocals
Probyn Gregory - guitar, French horn, trumpet, electro-theremin, vocals
Jeffrey Foskett - guitar, percussion, vocals, arrangements
Bob Lizik - bass guitar
Darian Sahanaja - keyboards, vibraphone, vocals, arrangement on "Brian Wilson"
Scott Bennett - keyboards, vibraphone, percussion, vocals, arrangement on "Brian Wilson"
Jim Hines - drums
Taylor Mills - percussion, vocals
Mike d'Amico - percussion, guitar, vocals
Paul Mertens - alto saxophone, baritone saxophone, flute, piccolo flute

References

2000 live albums
Brian Wilson albums
Albums produced by Brian Wilson
Albums recorded at the Roxy Theatre